Shark Wrangler is an American reality television series on History. The series debuted on July 1, 2012.

A similar series first aired on the National Geographic Channel, first as "Expedition Great White" in 2010, and then as "Shark Men" a year later.

Cast
 Chris Fischer
 Brett McBride
 Jody Whitworth
 Denny Wagner
 Todd Goggins
 Alex Snow
 Ryan Johnson
 Juan Valencia
 Luis Torres

Episodes

References

External links
 
 

2010s American reality television series
2012 American television series debuts
History (American TV channel) original programming
English-language television shows
American non-fiction television series